Carl Gustaf Armfeldt (9 November 1666 – 24 October 1736) was a Swedish officer, general and friherre (baron) who took part in the Great Northern War.

Early life
Carl Gustaf Armfeldt was born in Swedish Ingria to lieutenant colonel Gustaf Armfelt and  Anna Elisabet Brakel. Like other members of his family Armfelt devoted himself to war and at seventeen years' age joined Nylands kavalleri as a cadet. In 1685 he left this position and left for France where he joined prince Ferdinand of Fürstenberg's regiment as a mere footsoldier. He campaigned in France for twelve years and returned to Sweden as a captain.

Great Northern War
Due to his military experience he was employed in the Finnish army as a generaladjutant in 1701 and stayed with this army for most of the Great Northern War. He was named commander of the Finnish army in 1713.

During the long war he distinguished himself in several occasions, especially during the defense of Helsingfors in 1713, but met an overwhelming Russian force and was defeated at the battle of Storkyro in 1714.

1718 Norwegian Campaign
In 1717 Armfeldt was promoted to lieutenant general and commanded the Swedish force which on the orders of Charles XII of Sweden was sent into Norway to take Trondheim. Poorly equipped, Armfelt pulled out after the king fell at Fredrikshald.

The ensuing disaster that struck his army is known as the Carolean Death March. On New Year's Eve 1718 he arrived at Norwegian Tydal, with 80 kilometers to the closest Swedish village in Jämtland. When the troops had marched 10 kilometers from Tydalen, a severe blizzard struck from the northwest. The bitter cold killed the guide on the very first day, and the army wandered blindly in the mountains (Sylan mountain range). On the following nights, hundreds more perished. Of the over 5,000 men who left Tydalen, only 2,100 were found alive on arrival at Duved.

Later life
In 1719 Armfelt was named governor of Viborg county but never took office, as the county was under Russian control and was ceded to Russia after the treaty of Nystad. He was elevated to friherre on 5 July 1731 and named general of infantry in 1735. According to the Pernå parish records (cited by Hornborg, 1952) he died at Liljendal in Nyland on 24 October 1736, and was interred at Isnäs on 3 December 1736.

He was married in 1700 to Lovisa Aminoff (1685–1741), daughter of cavalry captain Johan Fredrik Aminoff. Gustaf Mauritz Armfelt is his grandson.

References

1666 births
1736 deaths
Swedish Army generals
Caroleans
Swedish military personnel of the Nine Years' War
Swedish military personnel of the Great Northern War